Glasgow Maryhill may refer to:
 Maryhill, Glasgow, Scotland
 Glasgow Maryhill (UK Parliament constituency)
 Glasgow Maryhill (Scottish Parliament constituency)